KRVM may refer to:

 KRVM (AM), a radio station (1280 AM) licensed to Eugene, Oregon, United States
 KRVM-FM, a radio station (91.9 FM) licensed to Eugene, Oregon, United States